The Chef Show is an American television cooking show presented by Jon Favreau and Roy Choi that premiered on Netflix on June 7, 2019. Its creation was inspired by Favreau's training under the tutelage of Choi in preparation for the 2014 film Chef. Volume 2 premiered on September 13, 2019 and volume 3 premiered on February 19, 2020. A second season premiered on September 24, 2020.

Premise
The Chef Show features director-actor Jon Favreau and chef Roy Choi with guests, cooking and interviewing.

Guests

Episodes

Series overview

Season 1 (2019–20)

Season 2 (2020)

References

External links
 
 

2019 American television series debuts
2010s American cooking television series
English-language Netflix original programming
Television series created by Jon Favreau